Nicodemus I (November 30, 1828 – February 18, 1910) was Greek Orthodox Patriarch of Jerusalem (1883–1890). He was born in Constantinople.

In 1890 he built a summer house near the San Simon monastery in Katamon

References

1828 births
1910 deaths
19th-century Greek Orthodox Patriarchs of Jerusalem
Clergy from Istanbul